Franklin Hubertus  Castellanos is a Honduran professional footballer.

Career

Youth and college
Castellanos played for the Parsippany SC and  New York Red Bulls Academy at various levels. He  also played  college soccer for the Iona Gaels from 2010 to 2013. While with the Gaels he played in 75 matches scoring 17 goals and recording 37 assists.

During the 2014 season Castellanos played for the New York Red Bulls U-23 in the National Premier Soccer League. He helped the team capture the 2014 NPSL title appearing as a starter in the league final. He also played with the U23s in the U.S. Open Cup.

Professional
Castellanos signed with New York Red Bulls II for the 2015 season and made his debut for the side in its first ever match on March 28, 2015, in a 0–0 draw with Rochester Rhinos. On June 27, 2015, Castellanos scored his first goal for the club in a 4–1 victory over Saint Louis FC.  On  August 2, 2015, Castellanos scored the winning goal in stoppage time to help New York to a 2–1 victory against Saint Louis FC. A few days later, on  August 5, 2015, Castellanos scored the opening goal for New York in a 2–2 draw at Charlotte Independence.

On July 23, 2015, Castellanos made his debut with the New York Red Bulls first team in a 4–2 victory over Premier League Champions Chelsea F.C. in a 2015 International Champions Cup match. Castellanos scored the first goal of the match for New York and assisted on another.

References

External links 
icgaels.com player profile

Living people
Honduran footballers
Honduran expatriate footballers
Iona Gaels men's soccer players
New York Red Bulls U-23 players
New York Red Bulls II players
Association football midfielders
Expatriate soccer players in the United States
Year of birth missing (living people)